Lathi Nach, also known as Tharu stick dance is a cultural dance of the Tharu people. This dance is mainly performed during the Dashain festival. It is similar to Dandiya Raas, performed in the Indian state of Gujarat, but varies in movement and style. In this ritual dance all dancers should either be men or women only, as they must wake up holy sprite goddess Durga. 

Laathi Nach has become a popular tourist attraction in Nepal, particularly Chitwan.

References

External links
Tharu Stick Dance, Nepal, outside at night, at Youtube
Tharu Stick Dance in 2015 and in 2012 at same venue, inside, at Youtube
Tharu Stick Dance of Gochhada nawalparasi, outside in daytime, at Youtube

Ritual dances
Dance in Nepal
Nepalese folk dances
Tharu culture
Culture of Bagmati